David Zepeda (born as David Anastasio Zepeda Quintero on September 19, 1973) is a Mexican actor, model and singer. He is known thanks for participating in soap operas such as Acorralada, Abismo de pasión and Por amar sin ley. In 2019, Zepeda debuts in Telemundo participating in the soap opera La Doña as Jose Luis Navarrete from the second season to release in January 2020.

Biography 
David Zepeda was born on September 19, 1974 in Nogales, Sonora in Mexico. Best known for his roles in various telenovelas, as well as some film roles. In the film Desnudos, he appears nude in a group sex scene, which is his most daring role to date. He was also part of the nude play Cuatro XXXX, where he was fully nude.

Career

2000s
In 2007, David Zepeda debuted as the main protagonist of American telenovela produced by Venevision Acorralada, along with protagonists Sonya Smith and Alejandra Lazcano.

In 2009, he played the main antagonist in Carla Estrada's telenovela Sortilegio, along with, Jacqueline Bracamontes, William Levy and Ana Brenda Contreras. In the 28th TVyNovelas Awards, he won the category of Best Male Antagonist.

2010s 
In 2010, David Zepeda played as antagonist in Nicandro Díaz's telenovela Soy Tu Dueña as Alonso Peñalvert, together with ensembled cast of Lucero, Fernando Colunga and Gabriela Spanic.

In 2011, he starred in Rosy Ocampo's telenovela, La fuerza del destino as Ivan Villagomez/McGuire, alongside Sandra Echeverría, Gabriel Soto and Juan Ferrara.

In 2012, he starred as the protagonist in Abismo de pasión as Damián Arango, along with Angelique Boyer, Mark Tacher, Blanca Guerra and Altaír Jarabo. Due to his performance in the telenovela, he won the 31st TVyNovelas Awards for TVyNovelas Award for Best Lead Actor.

In 2013, David Zepeda starred as Ricardo Sánchez Bretón, the protagonist in Rosy Ocampo's telenovela, Mentir para vivir, along with Mayrín Villanueva, Diego Olivera and Altaír Jarabo. In July 2013, David Zepeda debuted as a singer by releasing his first studio album titled Volverte a Enamorar, along with his first single ″Talisman″.

In 2014, he was signed on to star in Nicandro Diaz's telenovela Hasta el fin del mundo to replace Pedro Fernandez who had quit the show due to marital and health issues, based on the Argentine telenovela produced by Telefe, entitled Dulce amor.

In 2016 he co-starred in the telenovela Tres veces Ana with Angelique Boyer and Sebastian Rulli. On April 12, 2016, Zepeda launched his second album, 1+1=1, in which he debuted as a songwriter with four themes. On November 10, 2016, David Zepeda was confirmed as the male lead in La doble vida de Estela Carrillo alongside Ariadne Diaz.

From 2018 and 2019, he stars in the telenovela Por amar sin ley produced by José Alberto Castro with Ana Brenda Contreras, Mexican version of La ley del corazón. After the soap opera Por amar sin ley ended in the second season, he entered Telemundo to star in an American television series La doña in the second season, along with Aracely Arámbula and Carlos Ponce.

2020s 
In February 2020, David Zepeda participated in the Mexican television series, under a production by José Alberto Castro M.D.: Life on the Line as Ricardo Bustamante.

Personal life 
Zepeda is the youngest of four brothers. He represented Mexico and placed first runner-up to Australia's Brett Wilson in the Manhunt International 2000 pageant, held in Singapore on September 29, 2000.

On April 10. 2018, Zepeda was assaulted where he circulated in the Mixcoac in Mexico City.

Filmography

Films

Television

Discography

Awards and nominations

TVyNovelas Awards

Premios People en Español

Premios Juventud

References

External links

 

1974 births
Living people
Male beauty pageant winners
Mexican male models
Mexican male stage actors
Mexican male telenovela actors
People educated at Centro de Estudios y Formación Actoral
People from Nogales, Sonora
Male actors from Sonora
21st-century Mexican singers
21st-century Mexican male singers